Achamillai Achamillai is a 1984 Indian Tamil-language political drama film written and directed by K. Balachander. It stars Rajesh and Saritha, with Pavithra, Jeyagopi, Delhi Ganesh, Charle and Delhi Nayakar in supporting roles. It revolves around an selfless idealist whose morality declines when he takes to politics, alienating his wife in the process.

Achamillai Achamillai was released on 18 May 1984 and received critical acclaim. It won three awards at the 32nd Filmfare Awards South, as well as the National Film Award for Best Feature Film in Tamil. The film's title refers to a poem written by Subramania Bharati.

Plot 
Thenmozhi is a textile factory worker in a village. She develops a liking for Ulaganathan, an idealist in the same village who is respected for his integrity and selflessness. Upon the approval of Ulaganathan's father Brahmanayagam, Ulaganathan and Thenmozhi marry on 15 August, India's Independence Day. The couple lead a happy life and work for the welfare of the village.

Members from the Yellow political party want Ulaganathan to join them. At first he declines, but they lure him by promising to provide him with a ministerial position if the party wins. Thenmozhi becomes upset with the developments as she notices a significant change in Ulaganathan's attitude. She argues with him frequently about this, but he is unfazed. When Thenmozhi becomes pregnant, she goes to her visually impaired father's home for delivering the child.

By the time Thenmozhi returns with their child, a son, Ulaganathan has left the Yellow party to join the opposing Purple party, the result of party switching. He also shifts to a new house gifted by the Purple party. Thenmozhi, who is unable to accept his lack of loyalty, futilely argues with him. He orders her to remain completely obedient to him without arguing or advising. The rift between them becomes wider when Thenmozhi refuses to satisfy Ulaganathan's sexual desires, citing his lack of loyalty.

Alangaram, who previously wanted to marry Ulaganathan, becomes his mistress and Ulaganathan neglects Thenmozhi. Alangaram and her mother slowly take control over the household, with Brahmanayagam powerless. Thenmozhi's brother Suthanthiram, who had run away in childhood, returns and fights for his sister's rights, but fails as he is silenced by Ulaganathan with money. All of this causes Thenmozhi to leave with her child to her father's home. Once when she is not home, the child which was left in her father's custody, takes infant steps, and is washed away in a flood. Ulaganathan arranges for his father-in-law's eye surgery, and Thenmozhi becomes isolated with everyone supporting Ulaganathan.

With Ulaganathan's party having become weaker, he is advised by the party chief to assemble more members to make the party stronger. Ulaganathan plans to organise a communal riot in the village to lure people to his side. Alangaram overhears this, tells Thenmozhi, but drowns in quicksand when escaping Ulaganathan's henchmen. Thenmozhi asks Ulaganathan to end his atrocities and surrender. But he mocks her and advises her to join him for the upcoming Independence Day ceremony, which is also their wedding anniversary.

The next day, Thenmozhi comes to the ceremony, where a statue of Mahatma Gandhi is to be unveiled by Ulaganathan, with a large garland of flowers and garlands him. As Ulaganathan expresses happiness about his wife's apparent return to his side, she takes a knife hidden in the garland and stabs him to death. The police arrest Thenmozhi and Suthanthiram sombrely sits under Gandhi's statue.

Cast 
 Rajesh as Ulaganathan
 Saritha as Thenmozhi
 Pavithra as Alangaram
 Ahalaya as Sudali
 Delhi Ganesh as Brahmanayagam
 Delhi Nayakar as Suthanthiram (credited as Prabhakar)
 Charle as Patchi (Petchiappan)
 Jeyagopi as Palavesam<ref>{{Cite web |last=Basumani K |date=6 July 2017 |title=``திறமைசாலி நடிகர்களுக்கு மரியாதையே இல்லை! - வருந்தும் சென்னை தொலைக்காட்சியின் முதல் நடிகர் |url=https://cinema.vikatan.com/tamil-cinema/91500-tv-actor-gopi-interview |url-status=live |archive-url=https://web.archive.org/web/20220704021929/https://cinema.vikatan.com/tamil-cinema/91500-tv-actor-gopi-interview |archive-date=4 July 2022 |access-date=3 July 2022 |website=Ananda Vikatan |language=ta}}</ref>
 Vairam Krishnamoorthy
 Veeraiah
 Radha Ravi as Henchman (uncredited)

 Production 
The film was produced by Kavithalayaa Productions, Balachander's production house. Apart from direction, he took charge of the story, screenplay, and dialogue. Cinematography and editing were handled by B. S. Lokanath and N. R. Kittu, respectively. The song "Odukira Thanniyila" was shot at a waterfall in Courtallam and most of the scenes were shot in places near Courtallam.

 Themes and analysis Achamillai Achamillai is a satire on the Indian political system. Its underlying theme is party switching, a common phenomenon that exists in the country's political system, and its impact on small-time politicians. Balachander added a dwarf character named Suthanthiram to metaphorically depict that the freedom of the nation is stunted.

 Soundtrack 
The soundtrack was composed by debutante V. S. Narasimhan. He claimed he had been recommended to Balachander by Ilaiyaraaja. The songs "Aavaram Poovu" and "Odukira Thanniyila" attained popularity.

 Release and reception Achamillai Achamillai was released on 18 May 1984 to critical acclaim. The film had a 100-day run in theatres and was commercially successful. It was the only Tamil film to be screened at the 'Indian Panorama' 10th International Film Festival of India in 1985. A contemporary review from Ananda Vikatan stated that while everyone at the time was using cinema for entertainment, Balachander used it as a weapon to attack the evils of the society. The film received criticism for showcasing violence. Some critics were concerned about the idea that even educated people would be corrupted if they come to politics, while a few others opined that the film did not provide a solution for the problem.

 Accolades 

 Legacy Achamillai Achamillai is widely regarded as one of the finest that Balachander has directed. In a 2006 interview with The Hindu, Balachander listed the film as one of his favourites. G. Dhananjayan, in his 2011 book The Best of Tamil Cinema: 1977 to 2010, called the film a bold attempt by K. Balachander after Thanneer Thanneer (1981), and lauded the director for his dialogue filled with sarcasm. Analysing the dominance of female characters in Balachander's films, Baradwaj Rangan listed the heroine of Achamillai Achamillai'' as an example.

References

Sources

External links 
 
 

1980s political drama films
1980s political satire films
1980s Tamil-language films
1984 films
Best Tamil Feature Film National Film Award winners
Films directed by K. Balachander
Films scored by V. S. Narasimhan
Films with screenplays by K. Balachander
Indian political drama films
Indian political satire films
Mariticide in fiction